Veronika Kratochwil (born 9 September 1988 in Baden bei Wien) is an Austrian springboard diver. She achieved a seventh-place finish for the women's springboard event at the 2006 FINA World Junior Diving Championships in Kuala Lumpur, Malaysia, accumulating a score of 369.70 points.

Kratochwil represented Austria at the 2008 Summer Olympics in Beijing, where she competed as a lone female diver for the women's springboard event. She placed twenty-seventh out of thirty divers in the preliminary round by five points behind Ukraine's Hanna Pysmenska, with a total score of 218.75 after six successive attempts.

References

External links
 
NBC 2008 Olympics profile

1988 births
Living people
21st-century Austrian people
Austrian female divers
Olympic divers of Austria
Divers at the 2008 Summer Olympics
Austrian people of Czech descent
Sportspeople from Baden bei Wien